Salmon Turrell Farmstead is a historic home and farm located in Whitewater Township, Franklin County, Indiana.  The house was built about 1830, and is a two-story, four bay, Federal style brick I-house.  It has a -story brick ell.  Also on the property is a contributing bank barn built about 1830.  A series of additions have been made to the barn starting about 1845.

It was listed on the National Register of Historic Places in 2009.

References

Farms on the National Register of Historic Places in Indiana
Federal architecture in Indiana
Houses completed in 1830
Buildings and structures in Franklin County, Indiana
National Register of Historic Places in Franklin County, Indiana